Harriette Newell Woods Baker (pen names Mrs. Madeline Leslie and Aunt Hattie; August 19, 1815 – April 26, 1893) was an American author of books for children, and editor. Her career as an author began when she was about 30 years old. She devoted herself successfully to novels; but after about 15 years, she wrote popular religious literature. Her most famous book, Tim, the Scissors Grinder, sold half a million copies, and was translated into several languages. Baker published about 200 moral and religious tales under the pen name "Mrs. Madeline Leslie". She also wrote under her own name or initials, and under that of "Aunt Hattie". She wrote chiefly for the young, and was still writing in 1893 when she died.

Early life and education
Harriette Newell Woods was born in Andover, Massachusetts, August 19, 1815. Her parents were Leonard Woods and Abigail Wheeler. She was one of the many children who were named after Harriet Newell, one of the first American missionaries. She was baptized on December 10, 1815 in Theological Seminary Church, which is now Philips Academy in Andover. Her father was the founder of Andover Theological Seminary and a friend of the polymath poet Oliver Wendell Holmes Sr. She was called "Hatty" during her younger years. According to an account from her father, she nearly died of typhoid fever when she was about two years old.

She had a nervous temperament, a lively imagination, and talents for composition. She also had a habit of walking in her sleep which had followed her from infancy. When she was a child, she had a guest in her house, William Schauffler. He was a German Jew who was sent to her father's care for his theological education. He remained in Andover for several years and most of the time in the Woods' house. Harriette saw that Schauffler had a grey overcoat that was too small for him and that he was shivering in the cold. This incident inspired her to form a sewing society with her Sunday School classmate, Elizabeth Stuart, and earn money to buy a cloak for Schauffler. After the sewing society, she and Stuart formed a literary society, which they named "The Fireside" with them being the only members. They met on alternate Wednesdays on which occasions they read a composition, a simple story, and discussed the styles with each other. This was before she published her work for the first time when she was eleven years old. She enclosed her short story to Deacon Nathaniel Willis with a note authorizing him to print it in his newspaper, The Youth’s Companion if he wished. She provided other contributions, from time to time, without informing the editor of her age.

On June 17, 1829, when Baker was nearly fourteen, she, together with four sisters and a cousin, Almira Woods, set off for Abbot Female Seminary, the new academy founded by Mrs. Nehemiah Abbott, She attended it during its first year of existence, though age fifteen. She then removed to an academy in Catskill, New York, where her eldest sister, Mary G. W. Smith, lived. After this, she studied under the instruction of private tutors in mathematics, history, and philosophy.

Career
At the age of 20, she married Rev. Abijah Richardson Baker, D. D., who was then a teacher in the Phillips Academy at Andover.
 She published during her residence in Medford, Massachusetts three small volumes, The String of Pearls, Louise Merton, and Frank Herbert. Of the second of these, the proof-reader in the office where it was printed, said: "I become so interested in the story that I forget to make the proper correction of typographical errors.” her duties as a clergyman's wife and mother of five sons prevented her from realizing ambition further except for occasional articles.

In 1850, she removed to the city of Lynn, Massachusetts, where her husband was pastor of the Central Church. There she assisted him several years in editing two monthly journals: The Mother’s Assistant, and The Happy Home, which were extensively circulated. Many of her contributions to these periodicals were subsequently transferred to her volumes. From that period, she wrote and published constantly, her works being issued by different firms in Boston and New York City.

In 1855, she published under the name of "Mrs. Madeline Leslie", The Courtesies of Wedded Life. About the same time appeared anonymously another large volume, entitled Cora and the Doctor, which was ascribed to many persons of eminence. In plot and literary finish, in power and pathos, this is considered one of her happiest efforts, and called forth flattering notices and reviews from Washington Irving and other distinguished critics. The name of its author was repeatedly called for, and at length the call was answered by its issue with other volumes from her pen in a series entitled, Home Life.

Many of her books had a religious or moral theme and her style was considered very true to life, with well drawn characters. Publishers of her books include Lee & Shepard. The wave of evangelical feeling that passed over New England consequent on the preaching of Dr. Finney, the evangelist, powerfully affected Baker, and turned her literary activities in religious channels. In the heyday of her success, the coming out of one of her books was looked upon as an event by her readers, and it was thought nothing remarkable to strike off an edition of 10,000 copies on the first appearance of a story whose title page bore the name of Madeline Leslie. Annual sales varied from 250,000 to 500,000.

Most of Baker's books were tales for Sunday-school and general reading. They attained great popularity, and several were republished in England, and were translated into German, French and Bohemian. Included in the list are the Silver Lake, Golden Spring, Brookside, as well as the "Tim" series and the "Leslie" stories. Tim: The Scissors Grinder, was her most popular book, and (in the form of a cheap reprint) was sold or given away by thousands in England. Some of these were published over the pseudonyms "Mrs. Madeline Leslie" and "Aunt Hattie". Others, such as The Courtesies of Wedded Life (1855; new ed., 1869), and Cora and the Doctor, were published anonymously.

In late years, a new generation appeared, which was somewhat out of touch with the spirit of Baker's writings. She was well known in the older literary circle of this country. Her literary tastes and keen zest for the study of human character and action remained with her even in later years. Possessing the Macaulayan faculty of plucking the very heart out of a book in a space of time that for others would hardly more than suffice for turning its pages, she found in reading an unfailing delight. She was reading Victor Hugo's novels this week at the rate of a book a day, and on the evening previous to her death held an animated conversation with her son, Dr. Charles E. Baker, about one of the characters in Les Misérables.

Personal life
While in Catskill, she had a relationship with John Maynard, whose father, before his death had been a friend to her father's. She ended the relationship when she was fifteen after hearing a sad account of John's behavior in Yale. On October 1, 1835, she married Abijah Richardson Baker (died 1876), who for 15 years was pastor of the Congregational Church at Medford, Massachusetts. He established and built up the Central Congregational Church at Lynn, Massachusetts and was also at one period, minister of the East Street Church in Boston. She was very affected by her husband's death on April 30, 1876, that she wrote about his sickness, which was to quote in her language "bound in green in her library in Brooklyn". She had since then moved home five times.

George Baker, her son, and his wife, Maggie had invited her to stay with them in Batavia. This was her first home and first journey alone. She arrived there around the winter of 1876–1877. She went east the following summer and stayed with her son William Baker in Northborough before they all returned to Boston. She visited Washington during the following winter before she went to New York. In 1880, she was living with her son, Dr. Charles Baker, her daughter-in-law, Mary, and her granddaughter, Sarah in Brooklyn, New York. In Brooklyn, she became greatly interested in a large sewing class in Charles' parish where she taught the class how to knit upon her son's request.

Death 
Baker died in Brooklyn, at the home of her son, Dr. Charles E. Baker, at 244, Washington Avenue, New York City on April 26, 1893. She was survived by five sons, four of whom were Episcopal clergymen. They were Dr. George Baker, rector of St. Luke's Hospital, New York; Dr. Charles E. Baker, of the Church of the Messiah, and Dr. Frank Woods Baker and Dr. Walter A. Baker, of Cincinnati. Another son, William Baker, M.D., was Professor of Gynecology in Harvard University.

According to her letters, on the evening of Tuesday, 11 April, two weeks before her death, she complained of feeling “poorly” and finding it difficult to sleep. Upon awakening, she coughed so incessantly that to quote in her own language, she “saw stars”. Becoming anxious, her daughter, Mollie, went over to St Luke's Hospital, New York, and secured a trained nurse. For a week after this bronchial attack, she felt very sick and prepared for death.

A day before her death she was in unusually good spirits and felt so well that she left her room to walk with her daughter, Mollie through the hall into a back room to see a sunset. She held an animated conversation with her son, Dr Charles Baker, that evening about one of the characters in “Les Miserables”. According to the nurse, she slept unusually well that night. In the morning at four, the nurse who was called to her patient's bedside by her heavy breathing, lifted her up, as she had been directed to do at such times, when she said “I believe I am going to have another bad turn.” Then the nurse gave her some medicine and rubbed her, and at a quarter before five the patient said “Thank you. I am relieved. Now I think I can sleep.” These were her last words before she almost instantly fell asleep. A few minutes later, the nurse who stood watching her was surprised at seeing a sudden change pass over the countenance of the sleeping patient, and almost immediately those signs of death which are so well known to a trained nurse, began to show themselves.

Her funeral was conducted by eight clergymen of the Episcopal Church on Friday afternoon, April 28, 1893. Her death was covered in the leading papers of the U.S. and referenced to in Andover academic institutions. She had  in her possession which she left for her family. Her grave was relocated to Andover, Massachusetts, the place where she was born.

Style and themes
Her characters were well drawn, and strikingly true to life. Her style was simple, chaste, often elegant; her plan was natural and progressive. Many of her scenes were picturesque and impressive, and charged with the power and pathos that belonged to the great masters of fiction. Moreover, her writings were all of moral tone, without mawkish sentimentality, but displaying a keen insight into the spiritual nature of man and woman, and a proper sense of their relations as moral and accountable beings. Baker's books were written in good English, and were remarkably free from catch phrases and harbarisms, from eccentricities and extravagance, from bad grammar and rhetorical faults, which might have depressed the standard of literature and corrupted public taste. Her style was simple, chaste, often elegant; her plan natural and progressive. Reviewers compared her books, for literary execution, moral aim, and influence, with those of Hannah More, Mary Martha Sherwood, and Charlotte Elizabeth. They inculcated high moral and religious sentiments, but were free from the dialectics of the schools, and from all sectarianism; and therefore they were found in the libraries of all Christian denominations.

Many of her books were republished in England and other countries. Few, if any of them, were more popular and useful than Tim the Scissors-Grinder, later published in what was called the Tim Series. This volume first appeared as a serial in the Boston Recorder. Long before its completion in that paper, numerous applications were received from different houses for the right to publish it in a book. From all parts of the country, positive testimonials were received of its excellence and usefulness in the conversion and sanctification of very many.

Selected works

Little Frankie Series (1860)
Robin Redbreast Series (1860)
Courtesies of Wedded Life (1860)
Lost but Found (1860)
Walter and Frank (1860)
Tim, the Scissors-Grinder (1861)
The Rag-Pickers, and other Stories (1861)
Sequel to Tim the Scissors-Grinder (1862)
Up the Ladder; or, Striving and Thriving (1862)
The Two Homes; or. Earning and Spending (1862)
Bound Girl, and other Stories (1862)
Bound Boy and the Young Soldier (1862)
The Prize Bible; or, Covetousness (1863)
The Organ-Grinder (1863)
Never Give Up; or, The Newsboys (1863)
White and Black Lies; or, Truth Better than Falsehood (1864)
Worth and Wealth; or, Jessie Dorr (1864)
Tim's Sister; or, A Word in Season (1864)
Light and Shade (1864)
The Secret of Success (1865)
Art and Artlessness (1865)
Every-Day Duties; or, The Schoolmates (1865)
Wheel of Fortune (1865)
Juliette; or, Now and Forever (1866)
Ingleside; or, Without Christ and With Him (1886)
Trying To Be Useful (1868)
In the Wilderness (1868)
Cora and the Doctor (1868)
Governor's Pardon (1868)
Paul Barton; or. The Drunkard's Son (1869)
Live and Learn (1869)
Behind the Curtin (1869)
Fashion and Folly (1869)
The Hard Sum, and other Stories (1869)
The Breach of Trust (1869)
Edith Withington: a Book for Girls (1871)
This and That (1887)
Minnie and Her Pets
Little Agnes
Aunt Hattie's Library for Girls
Aunt Hattie's Library for Boys
Walter and Frank; or, The Apthorp Farm

References

Citations

Bibliography

External links

 
 
 Harriette Newell W. Baker at Wikisource
http://www.amherst.edu/~rjyanco94/genealogy/acbiorecord/1830.html#baker-ar
http://www.readseries.com/auth-les-wise/baker-bio.html
http://readseries.com/auth-les-wise/bakerbib.html

1815 births
1893 deaths
19th-century American women writers
19th-century American novelists
American children's writers
American women children's writers
People from Andover, Massachusetts
Pseudonymous women writers
Congregationalist writers
American women novelists
Abbot Academy alumni
19th-century pseudonymous writers
American Congregationalists